The 2004–05 season of the Norwegian Premier League, the highest bandy league for men in Norway.

21 games were played, with 2 points given for wins and 1 for draws. Mjøndalen won the league, whereas no team was relegated, as the bottom two teams survived a playoff round.

League table

References
Table

Seasons in Norwegian bandy
2004 in bandy
2005 in bandy
Band
Band